Hurricane Andrew was a very powerful and destructive Category 5 Atlantic hurricane that struck the Bahamas, Florida, and Louisiana in August 1992. It is the most destructive hurricane to ever hit Florida in terms of structures damaged or destroyed, and remained the costliest in financial terms until Hurricane Irma surpassed it 25 years later. Andrew was also the strongest landfalling hurricane in the United States in decades and the costliest hurricane to strike anywhere in the country, until it was surpassed by Katrina in 2005. In addition, Andrew is one of only four tropical cyclones to make landfall in the continental United States as a Category 5, alongside the 1935 Labor Day hurricane, 1969's Camille, and 2018's Michael. Passing directly through the city of Homestead in Dade County (now known as Miami-Dade County), the hurricane stripped many homes of all but their concrete foundations and caused catastrophic damage. In total, Andrew destroyed more than 63,500 houses, damaged more than 124,000 others, caused $27.3 billion in damage (equivalent to $ billion in ), and left 65 people dead.

Andrew began as a tropical depression over the eastern Atlantic Ocean on August 16. After spending a week without significantly strengthening itself in the central Atlantic, the storm rapidly intensified into a powerful Category 5 hurricane while moving westward towards the Bahamas on August 23. Though Andrew briefly weakened to Category 4 status while traversing the Bahamas, it regained Category 5 intensity before making landfall in Florida on Elliott Key and then Homestead on August 24. Several hours later, the hurricane emerged over the Gulf of Mexico at Category 4 strength, with the Gulf Coast of the United States in its dangerous path. After turning northwestward and weakening further, Andrew moved ashore near Morgan City, Louisiana, as a low-end Category 3 storm. The small hurricane curved northeastward after landfall and rapidly lost its intensity, becoming extratropical on August 28, and merging with the remnants of Hurricane Lester and a frontal system over the southern Appalachian Mountains on August 29.

Andrew first inflicted structural damage as it moved through the Bahamas, especially in Cat Cays, lashing the islands with storm surge, hurricane-force winds, and tornadoes. About 800 houses were destroyed in the archipelago, and there was substantial damage to the transport, water, sanitation, agriculture, and fishing sectors. Andrew left four dead and $250 million in damage throughout the Bahamas. The cities of Florida City, Homestead, Cutler Ridge, and parts of Kendall received the brunt of Andrew. As many as 1.4 million people lost power at the height of the storm; some for more than one month. In the Everglades,  of trees were downed, while invasive Burmese pythons began inhabiting the region after a nearby facility housing them was destroyed. Andrew was considered a "dry hurricane" by multiple media networks. In Florida, Andrew killed 44 and left a then-record $25 billion in damage.

Prior to making landfall in Louisiana on August 26, Andrew caused extensive damage to oil platforms in the Gulf of Mexico, leading to $500 million in losses for oil companies. It produced hurricane-force winds along its path through Louisiana, damaging large stretches of power lines that left about 230,000 people without electricity. Over 80% of trees in the Atchafalaya River basin were downed, and the agriculture there was devastated. Throughout the basin and Bayou Lafourche, 187 million freshwater fish were killed in the hurricane. With 23,000 houses damaged, 985 others destroyed, and 1,951 mobile homes demolished, property losses in Louisiana exceeded $1.5 billion. The hurricane caused the deaths of 17 people in the state, 6 of whom drowned offshore. Andrew spawned at least 28 tornadoes along the Gulf Coast, especially in Alabama, Georgia, and Mississippi. In total, Andrew left 65 dead and caused $27.3 billion in damage. Andrew is currently the ninth-costliest Atlantic hurricane to hit the United States, behind only Katrina (2005), Ike (2008), Sandy (2012), Harvey (2017), Irma (2017), Maria (2017), Ida (2021), and Ian (2022) as well as the ninth-costliest Atlantic hurricane, behind the aforementioned systems. The storm is the third-strongest hurricane to hit the U.S. mainland by wind speed (.

Meteorological history

A tropical wave moved off the west coast of Africa on August 14. A ridge of high pressure to its north caused the wave to move quickly westward. An area of convection developed along the wave axis to the south of the Cape Verde islands, and on August 15, meteorologists began classifying the system with the Dvorak technique. The thunderstorm activity became more concentrated, and narrow spiral rainbands began to develop around a center of circulation. Initially, moderate wind shear prevented strengthening, until a decrease in shear allowed the depression to intensify into Tropical Storm Andrew at 12:00 UTC on August 17.

Shortly thereafter, the storm began weakening because of increased southwesterly wind shear from an upper-level low. On August 19, a Hurricane Hunters flight into the storm failed to locate a well-defined center and on the following day, a flight found that the cyclone had degenerated to the extent that only a diffuse low-level circulation center remained; observations indicated the barometric pressure rose to an unusually high . The flight indicated that Andrew maintained a vigorous circulation aloft. After the upper-level low weakened and split into a trough, the wind shear decreased over the storm. A strong high pressure system then developed over the southeastern United States, which built eastward and caused Andrew to turn to the west. Convection became more organized as upper-level outflow became better established. This underestimated both the strength and the speed of the storm, which would eventually make landfall in South Florida.

On August 23, the storm attained Category 5 status on the Saffir–Simpson hurricane scale, reaching peak winds of  a short distance off Eleuthera island in the Bahamas at 18:00 UTC. After reaching that intensity, the hurricane underwent an eyewall replacement cycle. As it crossed over the warm waters of the Gulf Stream, the hurricane rapidly re-intensified as the eye decreased in size and its eyewall convection deepened. This barometric pressure made Andrew the most intense hurricane to strike the United States since Hurricane Camille in 1969 and the strongest tropical cyclone to make landfall in Florida since the Labor Day hurricane of 1935. The United States would not experience another landfall from a hurricane at Category 5 intensity until Hurricane Michael in 2018.

As the eye moved onshore in Florida, the convection in the eyewall strengthened due to increased convergence, and Hurricane Hunters reported a warmer eyewall temperature than two hours prior. In the Gulf of Mexico, the eye remained well-defined as the hurricane turned to the west-northwest, a change due to the weakening of the ridge to its north. Andrew steadily re-intensified over the Gulf of Mexico, reaching winds of  late on August 25. As the high pressure system to its north weakened, a strong mid-latitude trough approached the area from the northwest. This caused the hurricane to decelerate to the northwest, and winds decreased as Andrew approached the Gulf Coast of the United States.

Andrew weakened rapidly as it turned to the north and northeast, falling to tropical storm intensity within 10 hours. After entering Mississippi, the cyclone deteriorated to tropical depression status early on August 27. Accelerating northeastward, the depression began merging with the approaching frontal system, and by midday on August 28, Andrew had lost its tropical identity while located over the southern Appalachian Mountains. The storm's remnants continued moving towards the northeast, fully merging with the remnants of Hurricane Lester and the frontal zone over the Mid-Atlantic, in Pennsylvania, on August 29.

Post-analysis on Andrew revealed that the storm was often stronger than operationally reported between early on August 22 and early on August 26. The paper also indicated that Andrew briefly re-intensified into a Category 5 hurricane around the time of landfall in South Florida early on August 24.

Preparations

Bahamas

Bahamas Prime Minister Hubert Ingraham, who took office while the storm was active, urged residents to "take this hurricane seriously". On August 22, hurricane watches were issued from Andros and Eleuthera islands northward through Grand Bahama and Great Abaco. They were upgraded to hurricane warnings later that day, and on August 23, additional warnings were issued for the central Bahamas, including Cat Island, Exuma, San Salvador Island, and Long Island, Bahamas. All watches and warnings were discontinued on August 24. Advance warning was credited for the low death toll in the country. A total of 58 shelters were opened at churches, government buildings, and schools.

Florida

Rainfall was projected to be between  along the path of the storm. In addition, the National Hurricane Center noted the likelihood of isolated tornadoes in Central and South Florida during the passage of Andrew on August 23 and 24. Several tropical storm and hurricane warnings were issued for much of Central and South Florida, from Titusville on the east coast to Venice on the west coast. Included in the warnings were Lake Okeechobee and all of the Florida Keys. By 18:00 UTC on August 24, all watches and warnings issued were discontinued after Andrew progressed into the Gulf of Mexico.

Governor Lawton Chiles declared a state of emergency and activated about one-third of the Florida National Guard. Many residents evacuated, most voluntarily, from Broward, Charlotte, Collier, Lee, Martin, Dade, Monroe, Palm Beach, and Sarasota counties. A total of 142 shelters opened in these counties and collectively housed at least 84,340 people. In Dade County alone, 515,670 people were ordered to evacuate. As Andrew was approaching, an estimated 20,000–30,000 tourists were in the Florida Keys (Monroe County). Overall, almost 1.2 million people evacuated, which contributed to the low number of fatalities, despite the intensity of the storm. Many evacuees also checked into hotels, with rooms completely booked as far north as Ocala. Ultimately, the sheer number of evacuees led to likely the largest traffic jam in the history of Florida, mostly along Interstate 95. United States Coast Guard vessels on or near the Florida coastline were either secured onshore or sent to ride out the storm at sea. Government offices and public and private schools were closed from Monroe County northward to St. Lucie County. Many colleges and universities in southeast Florida also closed. Major airports such as the Fort Lauderdale–Hollywood, Key West, Miami, and Palm Beach international airports closed.

Gulf Coast of the United States

Shortly after the storm emerged into the Gulf of Mexico from southern Florida, the National Hurricane Center issued hurricane watches and warnings for the Gulf Coast of the United States beginning at 13:00 UTC on August 24. After the initial hurricane watch from Mobile, Alabama, to Sabine Pass, Texas, the watches and warnings were expanded to eventually include areas from Mobile, Alabama, to Freeport, Texas. All watches and warnings on the Gulf Coast were discontinued late on August 26 after the hurricane moved inland over Louisiana.

Due to the hurricane's threat, workers fled oil platforms in the Gulf of Mexico, while the Coast Guard moved their boats inland. Officials in Mississippi suggested that about 100,000 people evacuate the coastal counties. Shelters were opened in Hancock and Harrison counties, though only 68 people went to a shelter in the former. Gambling ships were moved into harbors and inland canals. Two run-offs for special legislative elections scheduled for August 25 were postponed.

In Louisiana, Governor Edwin Edwards declared a state of emergency. About 1.25 million people evacuated from the central and southeast Louisiana, while approximately 60,000 others fled parishes in southwest Louisiana. A mandatory evacuation from Grand Isle was ordered by Mayor Andy Valence and the city council. In New Orleans, Mayor Sidney Barthelemy ordered the evacuation of about 200,000 residents in the low-lying areas of the city. Nine shelters were opened in the city, which were occupied by thousands of people. In response to computer simulations showing that storm surge from a tropical cyclone like Hurricane Andrew could over-top the levees, workers closed 111 floodgates. The New Orleans International Airport closed, with jumbo jets being flown to other airports. A total of 250 members of the Louisiana National Guard patrolled the streets during the storm. The Red Cross assisted with opening a shelter at the University of Southwest Louisiana's Cajundome in Lafayette, equipped to handle about 2,000 people.

In Texas, about 250,000 people evacuated Orange and Jefferson counties. Galveston City Manager Doug Matthews advised residents to develop an evacuation plan in case the city chose to call for evacuations. The city later decided against ordering an evacuation. School was canceled on August 25 for Beaumont, Port Arthur, and other areas of central Jefferson County, while schools were closed in Dickinson, High Island, Hitchcock, La Marque, Santa Fe, and Texas City on August 26. College of the Mainland, Galveston College, and Texas A&M University at Galveston were also closed. Emergency management crews in Corpus Christi began testing emergency generators and severe weather gear. The Comal County chapter of the Red Cross placed their disaster alert teams on standby and ready to respond if the hurricane threatened the Corpus Christi area.

Impact

Even though Andrew was a small tropical cyclone for most of its lifespan, it caused extreme damage, especially in the Bahamas, Florida, and Louisiana. The vast majority of the damage was as a result of extremely high winds, although a few tornadoes spawned by Andrew caused considerable damage in Louisiana. Throughout the areas affected, almost 177,000 people were left homeless. Outside of the Bahamas, Florida, and Louisiana, effects were widespread, although damage was minimal. Overall, $27.3 billion in losses and 65 fatalities were attributed to Andrew, although many other estimates range as high as $36 billion. Andrew was the costliest hurricane in U.S. history at the time, but is now ninth following hurricanes Katrina (2005), Ike (2008), Sandy (2012), Harvey (2017), Irma (2017), Maria (2017), Ida (2021), and Ian (2022).

Bahamas

In the Bahamas, Andrew produced hurricane-force winds in North Eleuthera, New Providence, North Andros, Bimini, and the Berry Islands. The storm first struck North Eleuthera, where it produced a high storm surge. At a small village in the northwestern portion of the island, more than half of the houses were destroyed and the rest of the buildings sustained minor to major damage. One person drowned from the surge in Lower Bogue, Eleuthera, and two others died in The Bluff. On Current Island, the hurricane destroyed 24 of the 30 houses. Harbour Island, near Eleuthera, reported wind gusts of  – the strongest gust speed observed in the Bahamas during Andrew's passage. News reports indicated severe damage to 36 houses on Harbor Island.

Andrew produced several tornadoes in the area. Only minor damage occurred in Nassau, according to the Bahamas Red Cross, but on the private island of Cat Cay, many expensive homes sustained heavy damage. Much of the northwestern Bahamas received damage, with estimated monetary losses reaching $250 million. A total of 800 houses were destroyed, leaving 1,700 people homeless. Additionally, the storm caused severe damage to the sectors of transport, communications, water, sanitation, agriculture, and fishing. Four deaths in the country were attributed to the hurricane, of which three were direct; the indirect fatality was due to heart failure during the passage of the storm.

Florida

Overall, Andrew caused about $25.3 billion in damage in Florida, making it the costliest hurricane to hit the state at the time. Some estimates in Florida put the damage as high as $34 billion (1992 USD, $  USD). Almost all of the damage in Florida was caused by strong winds, rather than storm surge or flooding that is often associated with a major hurricane. Of the 44 deaths attributed to the storm, 15 were direct fatalities, while 29 were indirectly caused by the storm. It was later noted that if Andrew had been slightly larger or made landfall a few miles further north, it would have significantly affected Miami and Fort Lauderdale, which would have resulted in an even higher damage and death toll. An analysis by the American Meteorological Society indicated that unlike most hurricanes, wind damage from Andrew was mostly north of the geometric center and occurred primarily on the eastern edge of the storm. Some officials in Florida considered Andrew the worst storm in the state since the Labor Day hurricane in 1935. But most others (particularly the media, former National Hurricane Center director Max Mayfield) in retrospect stated that Andrew was hardly "The Big One", but still very devastating.

The storm surge from Andrew was very limited in its overall coverage due the compactness of the hurricane, although it caused between $96 million and more than $500 million in losses to boats and buildings, based on various sources. At the height of the storm, more than 1.4 million people lost electricity and another 150,000 were without telephone service. It is estimated that throughout Florida, the storm damaged 101,241 homes and destroyed approximately 63,000 others – the vast majority in Dade County – with about 175,000 people rendered homeless. Smaller tropical cyclones like Andrew or Charley tend to produce less overall coverages and damages from the storm surge, in contrast to hurricanes such as Hugo, Ike, Ivan, and Katrina. In addition to homes, the storm damaged or destroyed 82,000 businesses,  of farmland, 31 public schools, 59 health facilities/hospitals, 9,500 traffic signals,  of power lines, and 3,000 watermains. Approximately 20 million cubic yards (15 million m3) of debris left by the storm were disposed of.

Strong winds from the storm were confined to a relatively small area, stretching from Key Largo to the Miami Beach area. Several other anemometers measuring the highest wind speeds on land were destroyed or failed. Tropical storm force winds reached as far north as West Palm Beach. Rainfall was generally light, possibly as a result of the storm's relatively fast movement. Heavy rainfall in other areas was sporadic, with precipitation reported as far north as Central Florida.

Although effects from Andrew were catastrophic, the extent of damage was limited mainly from Kendall to Key Largo due to the small wind field of the storm. The hurricane destroyed 90% of mobile homes in the county, including 99% of mobile homes in Homestead. At the Homestead Air Force Base, most of the 2,000 buildings on the base were severely damaged or rendered unusable. Damage to the base was extensive enough that it was recommended for closure. Nearby, in the small town of Florida City, over 120 homes were demolished and 700 others were damaged, while a number of other buildings were damaged beyond repair, including City Hall. Further north, damage to poorly constructed homes in communities such as Country Walk and Saga Bay resembled that of an F3 tornado. Four of the five condominiums at Naranja Lakes were destroyed. The Cutler Ridge Mall suffered severe wind and water damage; after the storm, significant looting was reported at that location. More than 50 streets were blocked by fallen trees and power lines. Agriculture suffered extensively as well, with an 85% loss to fruit crops such as avocados, limes, and mangoes. Crop damage in Dade County totaled about $509 million. The county suffered the vast majority of the damage from the hurricane, totaling approximately $25 billion. Andrew left at least 40 deaths in the county, 15 direct and 25 indirect.

Elsewhere, effects were relatively minimal, except in Broward, Monroe, and Collier counties. In Broward County, on the north side of the storm's path, damage in several municipalities was primarily limited to downed trees, several of which fell onto roads and power lines. In Pembroke Park, one of the worst affected cities in the county, approximately 260 mobile homes were damaged. Storm surge left coastal flooding in some areas, especially along state roads A1A and 858. Property damage reached about $100 million and three fatalities were reported in Broward County. In Everglades National Park and Biscayne National Park, more than 25% of trees were damaged or destroyed, including one-fourth of the royal palms and one-third of the pine trees in the former. In addition to the damage at Everglades National Park, effects in Monroe County were significant, especially in the Upper Florida Keys. Strong winds damaged billboards, awnings, commercial signs, several boats, planes, trees, and 1,500 homes, with 300 of those becoming uninhabitable. Damage in that county was about $131 million. Storm surge flooded low-lying areas, particularly in Goodland, Everglades City, and Marco Island. Many boats were damaged or destroyed by the rough seas and strong winds. The storm destroyed 80 mobile homes and severely damaged 400 others. Property damage in the county reached about $30 million.

Louisiana

Offshore, a group of six fishermen from Alabama drowned. Before making landfall, Andrew spawned an F3 tornado in LaPlace, which killed two people and injured 32. The tornado was on the ground for about 10 minutes, during which it damaged or destroyed 163 structures, leaving 60 families homeless. Collectively, 14 tornadoes were reported in the parishes of Ascension, Iberville, Pointe Coupee, and Avoyelles, as well as in Baton Rouge.

Along the Louisiana coastline, damages largely resembled those of a Category 2 hurricane. Twenty-six schools were affected, with damage totaling $2.6 million. Berwick High School, sheltering about 2,000 people, was deroofed during the storm. Generally, single-family homes fared well, with most losing only roofing shingles, though others suffered severe damage after large trees fell on them. In Cypremort Point State Park, several mobile homes were destroyed. Houses in Berwick, Morgan City, and Patterson suffered major damage. Throughout the parish, 1,367 dwellings were destroyed, 2,028 were severely damaged, and 4,770 others were impacted to a minor degree. Property damage alone in St. Mary Parish reached approximately $150 million. Iberia Parish was also among the most severely impacted parishes. Two schools collectively sheltering about 3,600 people in Jeanerette and New Iberia lost their roofs. One death occurred in the parish due to electrocution. A total of 407 residences were demolished, 2,528 others were extensively damaged, and 3,526 others were inflicted with minor damage. Overall, the parish suffered $125 million in property damage, while an additional $200 million in damage was inflicted on sugar crops.

Across the state, the hurricane damaged 23,000 homes and destroyed 985 homes and 1,951 mobile homes; private property damage was estimated at $1 billion. The high winds destroyed large areas of sugar and soybean crops, estimated at $289 million in damage. Strong winds also left at least 230,000 people without electricity. During the storm's passage, upwelling occurred in the Atchafalaya Basin and Bayou Lafourche, killing 187 million freshwater fish. Damage to the fishing industry was estimated at $266 million. Overall, losses in the state of Louisiana reached approximately $1.56 billion. A total of 17 deaths occurred in Louisiana, 8 directly and 9 from indirect causes. At least 75 injuries were reported.

Remainder of the United States

While Andrew was entering the Gulf of Mexico, oil companies evacuated hundreds of employees from offshore drilling platforms. The storm damaged 241 oil and gas facilities and toppled 33 platforms off the coast of Louisiana, causing significant disruptions in production. Additionally, 83 pipeline segments suffered damage to some degree. The oil industry lost about $12 million per day in the days following Andrew and $4 million daily by three weeks later. Initially, a production loss of 240,000 to 270,000 barrels per day occurred – approximately one-third of production throughout the Gulf of Mexico. Overall, Hurricane Andrew caused about $500 million in damage to oil facilities.

Winds were generally light in the state, reaching  in Port Arthur. As Andrew crossed into Mississippi, 3 severe thunderstorm warnings, 21 tornado warnings, and 16 flood warnings were issued. Funnel clouds were observed near the path of the storm, along with 26 tornadoes. Structural damage was generally minimal, occurring from the tornadoes and severe thunderstorms. One tornado in Kemper County destroyed a mobile home, while another twister in Lauderdale County demolished a mobile home, damaged five other dwellings, and injured four people. Additionally, a possible tornado damaged a home and two trailers in Lawrence County. Strong winds knocked down trees in the southwestern portion of the state. Flooding was mostly limited to the inundation of minor roads and low-lying areas in several counties.

The rainfall caused flooding in low-lying areas and creeks, covering a few county roads but not entering many houses or businesses. Along the coast, the storm produced flooding and high tides. Three damaging tornadoes occurred in the state. The most damaging tornado was spawned in Elmore County and moved from an area northeast of Montgomery to the south of Wetumpka and briefly lifted during its  track. The tornado destroyed 2 homes and damaged 18 homes, 1 mobile home, 2 barns, and 1 vehicle. One person was injured by the twister. Although 48 counties in Alabama reported wind damage, impact across the state was generally minor.

Tropical storm force wind gusts and damaging tornadoes extended eastward into Georgia. Several counties in the northwest and west-central portions of the state reported downed trees and tree limbs and fallen power lines, causing scattered power outages, but structural damage was generally minor. In Carroll County, several dwellings and barns were damaged, with one mobile home destroyed. At the Columbus Metropolitan Airport, buildings, billboards, and signs were damaged. Additionally, a tornado in Floyd County near Rome snapped and uprooted several trees, damaged several fences and homes, and flipped over a trailer, tossing it on top of four cars. Monetary losses in the state reached about $100,000. In Tennessee, thunderstorm winds and tornadoes associated with Andrew downed trees and power lines, but caused little overall impact to homes and buildings. Similarly, in North Carolina, thunderstorm winds toppled trees and power lines at a number of locations in the mountainous areas of the state, especially in Avery County. In West Virginia, the remnants of Andrew combined with a cold front to produce  of rain over portions of the state, causing flooding in areas of Morgantown with poor drainage. The remnants of Andrew also spawned several tornadoes in Maryland. A tornado in Howard County damaged several homes, some extensively. The twister also tossed and wrecked a recreational vehicle and its trailer, downed trees, and flattened cornfields. Precipitation continued along the path of Andrew's remnants through the Mid-Atlantic and Ohio Valley, with precipitation measured as far north as Upstate New York.

Aftermath

After the season had ended, the World Meteorological Organization's RA IV Hurricane Committee retired the name Andrew from the list of future names for Atlantic tropical cyclones due to its impact and damage and replaced it with Alex. The name Andrew will never again be used for another Atlantic hurricane.

Bahamas
Initially, the Bahamas National Disaster Coordinator believed that foreign aid was not required, but shortly after the storm, the Government of the United Kingdom began distributing blankets, food, ice, and water. , a Royal Navy Type 42 destroyer, was the operational guard ship at the time and assisted in relief operations in and around the Gregorytown area. In addition, assistance came from Canada, Japan, and the United States, as well as the United Nations. The American Red Cross delivered 100 tents, 100 rolls of plastic sheeting, and 1,000 cots. Rebuilding began quickly on the hardest hit islands. However, trees and vegetation were expected to take years to recover. Despite reconstruction efforts and the small number of resort lodgings affected (around 2%), officials expected a 10–20% decline in tourism. The Bahamian Government, observing that their response mechanisms were not sufficient, reformed the National Emergency and Management Agency.

United States
After assessing the devastation in Florida and Louisiana, U.S. President George H. W. Bush initially proposed a $7.1 billion aid package to provide disaster benefits, small-business loans, agricultural recovery, food stamps, and public housing for victims of Hurricane Andrew. After the House of Representatives appropriated aid to victims of Hurricane Iniki in Hawaii and Typhoon Omar in Guam, the cost was later increased to $11.1 billion. The bill, which was the most costly disaster aid package at the time, was passed by Congress as House Resolution 5620 on September 18, and signed into law by President Bush on September 23. The state of Florida alone received $9 billion through the disaster relief bill.

The Federal Emergency Management Agency (FEMA) was criticized for its slow response in both Florida and Louisiana. Even a month prior to Andrew, the House Committee on Appropriations – which oversees the budget for FEMA – released a report calling the agency a "political dumping ground" and a "turkey farm" due to its "weak, inexperienced leaders". Congressman S. William Green of New York, a member of the Appropriations Committee, stated that he believed the agency learned little from its botched response to Hurricane Hugo in 1989. However, Green also criticized local officials for expecting "them [FEMA] to come and run the whole show". Some FEMA officials responded that it was impossible to respond as they had been requested while also continuing to provide aid for the Los Angeles riots. FEMA spokesman Grant Peterson stated, "24 hours is not reasonable to expect to have all the resources of the federal government landing in the middle of a disaster."  Some responsibility for the slow response must rest with Florida Governor Lawton Chiles, who waited five days to submit the formal request for Federal assistance that FEMA officials believed was required before they were empowered to act.

Florida
In Florida, President Bush assessed damage in areas south of Miami with Florida Governor Lawton Chiles. The president quickly declared the region a disaster area, which provided public assistance to victims of the storm in Broward, Collier, Dade, and Monroe Counties. Lieutenant Governor Buddy MacKay flew over the impact area and described the scene as looking "like a war zone". Governor Chiles considered asking the Florida State Legislature to raise taxes, stating that "No matter how much Congress appropriates to repair damage from Hurricane Andrew, the state will face a substantial cleanup bill". Instead of raising taxes, Chiles signed a bill into law on December 17 that created a three-year reserve fund for losses to uninsured businesses and homes, as well as government and school buildings and functions. Additionally, the bill allowed South Floridians to keep an estimated $500 million in sales tax generated by rebuilding efforts.

Crime, especially looting and theft, rose sharply in the areas south of Miami immediately after Andrew. Reports indicate that merchandise was stolen at damaged or destroyed shopping centers in southern Dade County. Additionally, looting occurred in neighborhoods severely affected by the storm, even in homes where few possessions remained. Initially, the slow response of federal aid prompted Dade County Emergency Management Director Kate Hale to famously exclaim at a nationally televised news conference, "Where in the hell is the cavalry on this one? They keep saying we're going to get supplies. For God's sake, where are they?" Almost immediately, President Bush promised, "Help is on the way," and mobile kitchens, food, and tents, along with over 20,000 units from the Florida Army National Guard (124th Infantry Regiment from Florida); the 24th Infantry Division from Fort Stewart, the 82nd Airborne Division and logistical support soldiers from the 1st Corps Support Command's 189th Maintenance Battalion from Fort Bragg, and the 10th Mountain Division from Fort Drum. In order to provide temporary housing for the homeless, military personnel initially set up a total of five tent cities in Florida City and Homestead, while a sixth tent city was opened at the Miccosukee Indian Reservation shortly after Labor Day weekend. The Government of Canada dispatched a team 90 military engineers to repair community centers, hospitals, and schools. Additionally, a crew of 300 military personnel were sent to Miami via HMCS Protecteur to assist American relief teams.

The storm struck Florida in the midst of 1992 presidential election campaign. A poll conducted by CBS News in September showed that 65% of Dade County residents approved of Bush's handling of the disaster, while 61% of residents approved statewide. Despite the support of Bush's response and his proposal to rebuild Homestead Air Force Base, he benefited little politically and trailed 48–42% against Bill Clinton in another poll taken in September. Additionally, 75% of voters in Dade County and 82% of Floridians overall stated that the president's actions in response to Andrew would not impact their vote in November. Bush went on to carry the state of Florida, but by a margin of only 1.89%. The hurricane also impacted Governor Chiles politically. The state's response to the storm was perceived as poor, sinking Chiles' approval rating to 22%, while his disapproval rating rose to 76%. However, Chiles was able to recover prior to the 1994 gubernatorial election.

In the aftermath of the storm, extensive psychological effects were documented. Difficulty during clean-up and recovery led to increased divorce rates and a spike in posttraumatic stress disorder (PTSD). The cases of PTSD primarily impacted children. A sampling of 378 adolescents by the University of South Carolina's Department of Epidemiology and Biostatistics indicated that 3% of males and 9% of females met the criteria for PTSD. Dozens of children in the area attempted suicide, while counselors reported that between 50 and 60 children discussed killing themselves between December 1992 and January 1993. A panel of psychiatrists and psychologists at the University of Miami agreed that as many as 90% of residents in the worst impacted areas would experience at least a few symptoms of PTSD. Within six months, the circumstances related to the aftermath of Andrew led to at least five suicides and four homicides.

Although proposals to rebuild Homestead Air Force Base were initially rejected, the United States Department of Defense eventually expended over $100 million to begin repairs. Unsalvageable buildings were demolished. Reconstruction then began on a Florida Air National Guard tower, air traffic control tower, and maintenance hangars. Next, the rebuilding of communications, medical, security facility, vehicle maintenance, and wing headquarters buildings began. On March 5, 1994, the base reopened as Homestead Air Reserve Base. Prior to Andrew, the base employed approximately 6,500 military personnel and 1,000 civilians and annually added about $450 million to the local economy. After its reopening, Major Bobby D'Angelo expected the base to annually contribute less than half of that – between $180 million and $200 million. The city of Homestead spent about $6 million on rebuilding the Homestead Sports Complex. Despite this, the Cleveland Indians, fearing the relocation of their more affluent fans, moved their spring training location to Chain of Lakes Park in Winter Haven. As homes were being rebuilt, FEMA provided free temporary mobile homes for 3,501 families and financial assistance to more than 40,000 other families for staying in hotel rooms, paying rent, and repairing homes. Nearly two years after Andrew, about 70% of homes in Homestead that were damaged or destroyed were repaired or rebuilt. Additionally, of the homes destroyed or severely damaged throughout Dade County, 36,000 had been restored by July 1994.

More than 930,000 policyholders in South Florida lost coverage after 11 insurance companies went bankrupt, caused by more than 600,000 insurance claims filed. This led the Florida Legislature to create new entities, such as the Joint Underwriting Association, the Florida Windstorm Underwriting Association, and the Florida Hurricane Catastrophe Fund, in an effort to restore adequate insurance capacity. Stricter building codes were created in Florida in the aftermath of Hurricane Andrew. A survey by Tim Marshall and Richard Herzog of the Haag Engineer Company in Carrollton, Texas, highlighted several construction issues. On the roof of some homes, the concrete tiles were glued to felt paper, which could easily be ripped by straight line winds. At houses with shingled roofs, it was found that some of the shingles were stapled perpendicular to the long axis, also allowing them to be torn away. After the tiles or shingles were peeled off, the plywood and prefabricated trusses were exposed to the weather. Eventually, the plywood and the trusses suffered structural failure, leading to roof collapses.

In July 1996, Governor Chiles established the Florida Building Codes Study Commission, with the purpose of assessing the building codes at the time, as well as enacting improvements and reform to the system. The commission study indicated that building codes and regulations were developed, amended, and administered by over 400 local jurisdictions and state agencies. The Florida Building Code was established in 1998 and put into effect by 2002. It phased out local laws and regulations and replaced them with universal statewide building codes. After hurricanes Charley, Frances, Ivan, and Jeanne in 2004, a study conducted by the University of Florida in the following year noted that "Homes built under the new Florida Building Code that became effective in 2002 sustained less damage on average than those built between 1994 and 2001." A report by the Florida Legislature in 2006 after hurricanes Dennis, Katrina, and Wilma in 2005 came to a similar conclusion, indicating that "they added further evidence that the Florida Building Code is working."

The hurricane also transformed the demographics of Dade County. A migration of mostly White families northward to Broward and Palm Beach County was ongoing, but accelerated after Andrew. Many of these families had used the money they received from insurance claims to relocate. The population growth was especially noticeable in southwestern Broward County, where land development was pushed "years ahead of schedule". Similar migration occurred within the Jewish community. Although there are areas of Dade County that still have significant Jewish populations, many Jews resettled to Coral Springs, west Fort Lauderdale, Hallandale Beach, Plantation, and Tamarac in Broward County and Boca Raton and West Palm Beach in Palm Beach County. The county had a net loss of about 36,000 people in 1992, while Broward and Palm Beach counties gained about 17,000 and 2,300 Dade County residents, respectively. By 2001, 230,710 people had moved from Dade County to Broward County, while 29,125 Dade County residents had moved to Palm Beach County. However, as Broward County became more crowded, 100,871 people relocated from Broward County to Palm Beach County. Consequently, the Hispanic population in south Dade County climbed rapidly. In Homestead, for example, the Latino population increased from 30% to 45% between 1990 and 2000.

During the storm, a facility housing Burmese pythons was destroyed, allowing many of them to escape into the Everglades. Although Burmese pythons – native to Southeast Asia – had been sighted in Everglades National Park since the 1980s, the destruction of this facility contributed significantly to the establishment of breeding populations in Florida. Due to rapid reproduction and ability to prey on many species, the population of Burmese pythons exploded, with possibly as many as 300,000 in the Everglades alone. Efforts have been made to curb the thriving population of these invasive snakes, including a ban on importation of the species to the United States since January 2012 and increased regulations on ownership of a boa constrictor or python.

Louisiana
On August 26, George H. W. Bush toured devastated areas of Louisiana with Governor Edwin Edwards. President Bush remarked, "The destruction from this storm goes beyond anything we have known in recent years," but noted that damage was less severe than in Florida. After his visit to Louisiana, President Bush declared only Terrebonne Parish as a disaster area, but later included 34 other parishes under this declaration. FEMA initially opened five field offices throughout Louisiana. These centers allowed residents to submit applications for aid. After Franklin mayor Sam Jones and Congressman Billy Tauzin criticized FEMA for failing to open a field office in Franklin, FEMA promised to do so. In the first few days following the storm, Louisiana National Guard members and local residents worked to remove debris such as downed trees, roofing shingles, and torn aluminum siding. The state National Guard also dispatched water purification units and tanks with filled potable water. About 1,300 National Guardsmen were deployed to southern Louisiana.

In early September, officials announced that 1,400 mobile homes, homes, and apartments would become available to residents whose dwellings became uninhabitable. House Resolution 5620 also included disaster aid to the state of Louisiana. In early December, the Small Business Administration (SBA) approved $33.2 million worth of low-interest loans for repairs to homes and businesses. By then, FEMA had received about 43,600 applications for aid, while approving $35.9 million in grants to over 18,000 households that were ineligible for loans from the SBA or were uninsured. In addition to the mobile homes already provided, FEMA spent $22.6 million on disaster housing.

See also

 List of Category 5 Atlantic hurricanes
 List of Florida hurricanes (1975–1999)
 1926 Miami hurricane – A Category 4 hurricane that caused catastrophic damage when it moved directly over Miami
 1947 Fort Lauderdale hurricane – Another destructive Category 4 hurricane that took a similar track
 Hurricane Betsy (1965) – Another devastating Category 4 storm that took a similar track in August–September 1965 in the Bahamas, southern Florida and eastern Louisiana 
 Hurricane Georges (1998) – Another Category 4 hurricane that caused major damage in Florida and Louisiana
 Hurricane Katrina (2005) - A Category 5 hurricane that took a similar track and devastated New Orleans and parts of Florida
 Hurricane Michael (2018) - Also made a very destructive impact in Florida as a Category 5 hurricane
 Hurricane Dorian (2019) – A Category 5 hurricane that devastated the Northern Bahamas when it stalled over it at peak intensity

Notes

References

External links

 Monthly Weather Review – Atlantic hurricane season of 1992
 National Hurricane Center's archive on Hurricane Andrew
 Hurricane Andrew: As It Happened – a television documentary aired on WTVJ, posted by Bryan Norcross

 
1992 natural disasters
1992 Atlantic hurricane season
Andrew
Category 5 Atlantic hurricanes
Retired Atlantic hurricanes
1992 in the Bahamas
1992 natural disasters in the United States
History of Florida
History of Louisiana
History of Mississippi